Fast and Loose is a 1954 British comedy film directed by Gordon Parry and starring Stanley Holloway, Kay Kendall and Brian Reece. The film was shot at Pinewood Studios near London with sets designed by the art director John Howell. It was based on the play A Cuckoo in the Nest by Ben Travers, the first of his Aldwych farces, which had previously been adapted as a 1933 film of the same title.

Plot

An unmarried couple are forced to adopt a series of pretexts when they stay at a country inn together with only one spare room.

Cast
 Stanley Holloway as Major George Crabb
 Kay Kendall as Carol Hankin
 Brian Reece as Peter Wickham
 Charles Victor as Lumper
 June Thorburn as Barbara 'Babsie' Wickham
 Reginald Beckwith as Reverend Tripp-Johnson
 Vida Hope as Gladys
 Joan Young as Mrs. Gullett, Inn Manageress
 Fabia Drake as Mrs Crabb
 Dora Bryan as Mary Rawlings, the maid
 Aubrey Mather as Noony
 Toke Townley as Alfred
 Alexander Gauge as Hankin
 Eliot Makeham as Railway porter
 John Warren as Chauffeur

Critical reception
TV Guide called the film an "unfunny remake of A Cuckoo in the Nest (1933)."

References

External links

1954 films
Films directed by Gordon Parry
1954 comedy films
British comedy films
Films shot at Pinewood Studios
Films set in London
Remakes of British films
British films based on plays
1950s English-language films
British black-and-white films
1950s British films